Aleksandr Savin (born 13 December 1978) is a Russian rower. He competed in the men's lightweight coxless four event at the 2004 Summer Olympics.

References

External links
 
 

1978 births
Living people
Russian male rowers
Olympic rowers of Russia
Rowers at the 2004 Summer Olympics
Sportspeople from Lipetsk